Peronospora anemones is a plant pathogen. It causes downy mildew on leaves of anemone (Anemone spp.). It occurs on various wild and garden forms of anemone, and has particular commercial importance on Anemone coronaria grown for cut flowers, for example in France and Italy.

References

External links 
Index Fungorum
USDA ARS Fungal Database

Water mould plant pathogens and diseases
Ornamental plant pathogens and diseases
Peronosporales
Species described in 1963